The Alismatales (alismatids) are an order of flowering plants including about 4,500 species. Plants assigned to this order are mostly tropical or aquatic. Some grow in fresh water, some in marine habitats.

Description
The Alismatales comprise herbaceous flowering plants of often aquatic and marshy habitats, and the only monocots known to have green embryos other than the Amaryllidaceae. They also include the only marine angiosperms growing completely submerged, the seagrasses. The flowers are usually arranged in inflorescences, and the mature seeds lack endosperm.

Both marine and freshwater forms include those with staminate flowers that detach from the parent plant and float to the surface. There they can pollinate carpellate flowers floating on the surface via long pedicels. In others, pollination occurs underwater, where pollen may form elongated strands, increasing chance of success. Most aquatic species have a totally submerged juvenile phase, and flowers are either floating or emergent. Vegetation may be totally submersed, have floating leaves, or protrude from the water. Collectively, they are commonly known as "water plantain".

Taxonomy
The Alismatales contain about 165 genera in 13 families, with a cosmopolitan distribution. Phylogenetically, they are basal monocots, diverging early in evolution relative to the lilioid and commelinid monocot lineages. Together with the Acorales, the Alismatales are referred to informally as the alismatid monocots.

Early systems
The Cronquist system (1981) places the Alismatales in subclass Alismatidae, class Liliopsida [= monocotyledons] and includes only three families as shown:
 Alismataceae
 Butomaceae
 Limnocharitaceae
Cronquist's subclass Alismatidae conformed fairly closely to the order Alismatales as defined by APG, minus the Araceae.

The Dahlgren system places the Alismatales in the superorder Alismatanae in the subclass Liliidae [= monocotyledons] in the class Magnoliopsida [= angiosperms] with the following families included:
  Alismataceae
  Aponogetonaceae
  Butomaceae
  Hydrocharitaceae
  Limnocharitaceae

In Tahktajan's classification (1997), the order Alismatales contains only the Alismataceae and Limnocharitaceae, making it equivalent to the Alismataceae as revised in APG-III. Other families included in the Alismatates as currently defined are here distributed among 10 additional orders, all of which are assigned, with the following exception, to the Subclass Alismatidae. Araceae in Tahktajan 1997 is assigned to the Arales and placed in the Subclass Aridae; Tofieldiaceae to the Melanthiales and placed in the Liliidae.

Angiosperm Phylogeny Group
The Angiosperm Phylogeny Group system (APG) of 1998 and APG II (2003) assigned the Alismatales to the monocots, which may be thought of as an unranked clade containing the families listed below. The biggest departure from earlier systems (see below) is the inclusion of family Araceae. By its inclusion, the order has grown enormously in number of species. The family Araceae alone accounts for about a hundred genera, totaling over two thousand species. The rest of the families together contain only about five hundred species, many of which are in very small families.

The APG III system (2009) differs only in that the Limnocharitaceae are combined with the Alismataceae; it was also suggested that the genus Maundia (of the Juncaginaceae) could be separated into a monogeneric family, the Maundiaceae, but the authors noted that more study was necessary before the Maundiaceae could be recognized.

 order Alismatales sensu APG III
 family Alismataceae (including Limnocharitaceae)
 family Aponogetonaceae
 family Araceae
 family Butomaceae 
 family Cymodoceaceae
 family Hydrocharitaceae
 family Juncaginaceae
 family Posidoniaceae
 family Potamogetonaceae
 family Ruppiaceae
 family Scheuchzeriaceae
 family Tofieldiaceae
 family Zosteraceae

In APG IV (2016), it was decided that evidence was sufficient to elevate Maundia to family level as the monogeneric Maundiaceae. The authors considered including a number of the smaller orders within the Juncaginaceae, but an online survey of botanists and other users found little support for this "lumping" approach. Consequently, the family structure for APG IV is:

 family Alismataceae (including Limnocharitaceae)
 family Aponogetonaceae
 family Araceae
 family Butomaceae 
 family Cymodoceaceae
 family Hydrocharitaceae
 family Juncaginaceae
 family Maundiaceae
 family Posidoniaceae
 family Potamogetonaceae
 family Ruppiaceae
 family Scheuchzeriaceae
 family Tofieldiaceae
 family Zosteraceae

Phylogeny 
Cladogram showing the orders of monocots (Lilianae sensu Chase & Reveal) based on molecular phylogenetic evidence:

References

Further reading 

 B. C. J. du Mortier 1829. Analyse des Familles de Plantes : avec l'indication des principaux genres qui s'y rattachent. Imprimerie de J. Casterman, Tournay
 W. S. Judd, C. S. Campbell, E. A. Kellogg, P. F. Stevens, M. J. Donoghue, 2002. Plant Systematics: A Phylogenetic Approach, 2nd edition. Sinauer Associates, Sunderland, Massachusetts .
 
 
 
 , in

External links 
 
 

 
Angiosperm orders